Caroline Hunt may refer to:

 Caroline Rose Hunt (1923–2018), American heiress and hotelier
 Caroline Hunt (home economist) (1865–1927), American home economist